QOS, QoS or Qos may refer to:

Entertainment
 Quantum of Solace, a James Bond story from the collection For Your Eyes Only 
 Quantum of Solace, a 2008 James Bond film
 A Question of Sport, a BBC television quiz show

Technology
 Quality of service, in computer networking, telephony etc.
 Quarterdeck Office Systems, a software company now part of Symantec

Other meanings
 Queen of the South F.C., a Scottish football club 
 Qos (deity), the national god of the Edomites

See also
 Queensland Ornithological Society Inc (QOSI), a state birding organisation in Australia
 QDOS (disambiguation)